Everest House is a high-rise located in Kolkata, India. It is located on Chowringhee Road.

Details
Everest House is the tallest building in the central business district of the city after Chatterjee International Center. It is a commercial building and was built in 1978. The building houses numerous offices, while the ground floor consists of showrooms.

See also
 List of tallest buildings in Kolkata

References

Office buildings in Kolkata
1978 establishments in West Bengal
Skyscraper office buildings in India